Julius Alexander also known as Julius Alexander of Emesa was prince from the Royal family of Emesa who lived in the 2nd century.

Although Alexander was a nobleman from Emesa, little is known of his origins. He may have been the son of Sohaemus of Armenia also known as Gaius Julius Sohaemus, who served as a Roman Client King of Armenia from 144 until 161, then again in 163 perhaps up to 186. He may have been a possible kinsman of the Roman Empress Julia Domna, which could explain him as a possible ancestor of the Roman emperor of the 3rd century Alexander Severus. Alexander and Severus share the same cognomen, Alexander. The name Alexander, is a dynastic name in the Emesani dynasty.

In his career, Alexander became a Bestiarius also known as an animal fighter. Alexander became a prowess at Lion-hunting. He was known to have brought down a Lion with his javelin while on horseback. His prowess of his profession, provoked the jealousy of the Roman emperor Commodus. There is a possibility that Lion hunting was a royal or imperial activity that Alexander may had deliberately participated in because he may had wanted the Roman throne for himself.

Commodus on his orders at night had Alexander hunted down and killed in Emesa c. 190. Alexander could have escaped from Commodus’ soldiers however, he didn't want to leave his youthful male-lover behind whom himself was an excellent horseman, so he died with Alexander. Alexander with his lover, left when the assassins arrived but were overtaken and killed.

After Alexander died, he was buried in the Emesani dynastic tomb in Emesa. Julius Alexander is mentioned in the histories of Cassius Dio and in the Augustan History, in The Life of Commodus.

See also
Bestiarii

References

Sources
A.R. Birley, Septimius Severus: The African Emperor, Routledge, 2002
B. Levick, Julia Domna: Syrian Empress, Routledge, 2007
L. de Arrizabalaga y Prado, The Emperor Elagabalus: Fact or Fiction?, Cambridge University Press, 2010
Roman Emperors: Commodus

People from Homs
Emesene dynasty
People of Roman Syria
Nerva–Antonine dynasty
People executed by the Roman Empire
2nd-century monarchs in the Middle East
2nd-century Arabs

de:Iulius Alexander